The Sri Lanka national cricket team toured India for cricket matches in October, November and December 2005. The tour was split into two legs, as India hosted South Africa for a One Day International series in between the India–Sri Lanka ODIs (which were played between 25 October and 12 November) and the Tests, which took place in December. Before the ODI series, India were ranked seventh on the ICC ODI Championship table, while Sri Lanka were second, and the Indian team had officially changed captains with Rahul Dravid taking over from Sourav Ganguly. However, India defied the rankings, winning the first four ODIs of seven to secure the series, and ended up with a 6–1 win despite resting captain Dravid and letting opener Virender Sehwag take over the helm for the sixth ODI. Sanath Jayasuriya, Sri Lanka's opener with 100 Tests and 345 ODIs, was dropped for the Tests after tallying 86 runs in the six ODIs, while Rahul Dravid moved up 18 places on the ICC player rankings with 312 runs for twice out. India's wicket-keeper MS Dhoni also made his mark, being the second highest averaging batsman of the series, and he made 183 not out in 3rd ODI matches at Jaipur, which was at the time the sixth-highest innings by a batsman in an ODI.

The Test series was won by India as well, this time 2–0, with three and a half days of play of the first Test lost due to rain. In the second Test, India took a 60-run lead on first innings after Anil Kumble took six for 72, and four half-centuries (from Irfan Pathan, Yuvraj Singh, Rahul Dravid and MS Dhoni) gave India 375 more runs before declaring. Kumble then completed a ten-for in the match as Sri Lanka were bowled out for 247, losing by 188 runs. In the second match, the margin of victory was even more convincing, Kumble getting seven wickets and Harbhajan Singh ten as Sri Lanka were bowled out for 206 and 249 on their way to a 259-run loss.

Squads

For the sixth and seventh ODI matches Venugopal Rao and JP Yadav was originally replaced by Mohammad Kaif and V. R. V. Singh  V. R. V. Singh failed a fitness test and Yadav was called up again.[3]
Ganguly was replaced by Wasim Jaffer for the third Test.[5]
Chamara Kapugedera was originally selected for the Test squad, but suffered a lateral ligament and was replaced by Mubarak.[4]

Tour matches

50-over: Mumbai Cricket Association President's XI v Sri Lankans

First-class: Indian Board President's XI v Sri Lankans

ODI series

1st ODI

2nd ODI

3rd ODI

4th ODI

5th ODI

6th ODI

7th ODI

Test series

1st Test

2nd Test

3rd Test

References

2005 in Indian cricket
2005 in Sri Lankan cricket
Indian cricket seasons from 2000–01
International cricket competitions in 2005–06
2005